Black is a 2005 Indian English- and Hindi-language drama film co-written, directed, and co-produced by Sanjay Leela Bhansali. It stars Amitabh Bachchan and Rani Mukerji in lead roles, with Ayesha Kapur, Shernaz Patel and Dhritiman Chatterjee in supporting roles. The film narrates the story of Michelle (Mukerji), a deaf-and-blind woman, and her relationship with her teacher Debraj (Bachchan), an elderly alcoholic teacher who himself later develops Alzheimer's disease.

In 2003, Bhansali announced the production of his new project, Black. Its idea first came up when he met several physically disabled children while shooting Khamoshi: The Musical in the 1990s. The story was inspired by the activist Helen Keller's life and her 1903 autobiography, The Story of My Life. Principal photography was done by Ravi K. Chandran in 100 days from mid-January to April 2004, taking place in Shimla and Film City. Omung Kumar was the production designer, while Sham Kaushal was the action director. After filming, it was edited by Bela Sehgal. The soundtrack and score were composed by Monty Sharma and Mychael Danna, respectively.

It received widespread critical acclaim upon release, with praise for its direction, story, screenplay, dialogues, cinematography, production design, costumes, and the performances of the cast, with major praise directed towards Bachchan and Mukherji's performances.

A recipient of several accolades, Black won 3 awards at the 53rd National Film Awards, including Best Feature Film in Hindi and Best Actor (Bachchan). At the 51st Filmfare Awards, the film won all its 11 nominations, including Best Film, Best Film (Critics), Best Director (Bhansali), Best Actor, Best Actor (Critics) (both for Bachchan), Best Actress and Best Actress (Critics) (both for Mukerji), thus becoming the most-awarded film at the Filmfare Awards at that time. Its record was later broken by Gully Boy (2019) at the 65th Filmfare Awards with 13 wins. It also became the fifth film to win all 4 major awards at the Filmfare Awards (Best Film, Best Director, Best Actor and Best Actress), after Guide (1965), Dilwale Dulhania Le Jayenge (1995), Kuch Kuch Hota Hai (1998) and Devdas (2002).

A Turkish remake, Benim Dünyam, was released in 2013.

Plot 
Michelle lost her eyesight and hearing after recovering from an illness at age two, and grows up as a violent, uncontrollable child. Her parents, Paul and Catherine, are at their wits' end trying to control her until Debraj, an elderly alcoholic teacher, enters their lives. Debraj takes it upon himself to build Michelle into someone who can express and communicate. He uses harsh methods initially disapproved by Michelle's father, who asks him to leave. Debraj stays while her father is away on a business trip, teaching Michelle a few words and better manners. He packs his bags when Michelle's father returns. Right before he leaves, Debraj gets frustrated seeing Michelle back to being insolent. He throws her into a fountain of water. It causes her to take to Debraj's lessons; she finally understands what water is, and can recognise her parents and vocalise the first syllables of small words. It convinces her parents to keep Debraj.

Many years later, Michelle has grown into an expressive woman who is even able to dance and expertly sign. She gets admission to pursue a bachelor's degree with Debraj's help, moving away from home and lives with Debraj and one of her maids. Over the next two years, she struggles to gain her degree, failing year after year, but maintains her spirit. One reason is that she must rely on Debraj for interpretation of the material but the principal helps by preparing the first-year course of study in braille. Debraj begins to succumb to Alzheimer's disease, at one point forgetting Michelle and leaving her stranded during a celebration. Therefore, Debraj decides to leave her.

Twelve years later, Michelle manages to gain her degree and with her proud parents looking on, gives a speech at graduation. She does not wear her graduation robe, insisting she wants Debraj to be the first one to see her in it. Debraj is now in a mental hospital due to his near-inability to remember his past and even how to speak. Michelle visits him wearing her robe; this causes glimmers of memory to return as Debraj realizes she has graduated. As the window opens to the rain, Michelle reaches out to it with Debraj's hand in hers, and the pair say the first syllable of "water", reminiscent of the first time Michelle understood the meaning of words when Debraj threw her into the fountain. The film ends with a scene of Michelle among a crowd of people dressed in black carrying candles toward a church.

Cast 
The cast is listed below:

 Amitabh Bachchan as Debraj Sahai
 Rani Mukerji as Michelle McNally
 Ayesha Kapur as young Michelle
 Shernaz Patel as Catherine "Kathy" McNally
 Dhritiman Chatterjee as Paul McNally
 Nandana Sen as Sarah McNally
 Sillo Mahava as Mrs. Gomes
 Mahabanoo Mody-Kotwal as Mrs. Nair
 Kenny Desai as Dr. Mehta
 Khursheed Khurody as a pianist at Sarah's wedding
 Shehnaz Anand as a teacher
 Zul Vellani and Kamal Adip as trustees

Production

Development 

The production of Black started when Sanjay Leela Bhansali came up with the idea for the film while the shooting of his directorial debut, the musical Khamoshi: The Musical, between 1993 and 1994 when he interacted with physically disabled children. After the successes of the romance Hum Dil De Chuke Sanam (1999) and the historical epic Devdas (2002)—one of the most expensive Hindi films ever made at the time—he had made a plan to make another film in the romantic genre. Still, the actress Jaya Bachchan criticized his work from Devdas and encouraged him to "attempt something different"; in later years, he would say that it motivated him to make Black. Bhansali chose to address a subject that no other directors had done before: "I didn't want to stop making a film straight from my heart because of the fear of losing my audiences." He described it as "a step towards a more complex kind of film than what we get in mainstream cinema", adding, "It is an uplifting tale on the triumph of the human spirit." He announced the film in July 2003, along with his other project, Bajirao Mastani, which would be released in 2015. The media declared it as his "most personal film".

Bhansali revealed that he was inspired by American activist Helen Keller's life story. However, he stated that he only used it as a reference and the film was "a completely original piece of work". Additionally, Bhansali also read Keller's autobiography The Story of My Life and other related books, including Geraldine Lawhorn's On the Crossroads (about a deaf-and-blind musician). In an interview with The Hindu, he said, "I was fascinated by the ways in which teachers and parents struggled to reach out to the hearing-impaired children. How do you start the communication? How do you keep it going? What takes other children a year to learn takes 10 years for them to absorb." In addition, some sources claimed that it served as a remake for Arthur Penn's The Miracle Worker (1962), but Bhansali denied the reports. Others claimed that the film was based on Prakash Kapadia's Gujarati play Aatam Vinjhe Paankh, which was inspired by The Miracle Worker.

Bhansali chose the word black for the film's title; according to him, black is his favorite color and he felt it has a "universal resonance". He explained how the color's monotones and shades were "very attractive if used intelligently", and it was "the best element ... that ... doesn't overshadow the characters or narrative". He added that it was "a powerful striking colour which describes the film's sensitivities", and defined his mood and temperament. "I wear black clothes most of the time. The colour calms me. When I decided to make a film about the world of the sightless, Black was the title that came to mind immediately", he said when interviewed by Sify. The same title had been registered by the actor Kumar Gaurav before, and Bhansali asked him to relinquish and gave the title for his next project. According to an article published by Screen in November 2005, Gaurav saw that the film was "bold and path-breaking"; consequently, he finally gave up the title. As gratitude, Bhansali credited Gaurav's name in the opening credits of Black.

Bhansali told The Telegraph that Keller's life was an "exemplary to all of us", believing that he had "personally learned so much from her"; he stated that he learned "the value of a teacher in any student's life". Journalists asserted that his involvement in both Black and Bajirao Mastani (a period film about the Peshwa Baji Rao I and his second wife Mastani) proved his ability in two opposite film genres; he expressed: "It is a conscious process of rejuvenation as a filmmaker. I have to reinvent myself as a creative person." He then described the former film as "an uplifting tale on the triumph of the human spirit", and it was "about feeling, not speaking". Furthermore, he added, "Black is about the love between a girl and her teacher. They teach each other the dignity of living. To call Black a love story is a true compliment. Black is a pure love story."

Casting 

On the same day of the film's announcement, Amitabh Bachchan and Rani Mukerji were officially cast in the lead roles. Bachchan featured as Debraj Sahai, a role which he described as a "brilliant teacher but an alcoholic", and he took it as an attempt to avoid typecasting. Bhansali, who is a "diehard fan" of him, said that he actually wanted to cast him (and his wife Jaya) in Khamoshi: The Musical. However, that was the time when Bachchan took a hiatus from his acting career. Bhansali eventually cast Bachchan in Black, after the actor watch his previous work, Hum Dil De Chuke Sanam (1999). Bachchan had big expectations with Black, as he said in an interview to the Deccan Herald, "I feel the Indian audience should like this film." He praised the "fascinating" and "unusual" screenplay of the film, stating, "To be very frank, I would have said 'Yes' even without listening to the script."

To prepare for his part, Bachchan underwent special training before the shooting. He visited schools for physically disabled children and learned haptic communication, which he found to be "very weird because we can not see, hear or talk", from them for six to seven months; he read some books related on it. Also, he did extensive research about Alzheimer's disease and what happens after a person being affected by it. He thought that it "was the most-challenging role... It is a first-time experience because there is not even a single scene in this film that I felt I have done before."

Meanwhile, Mukerji got the role of Michelle McNally (which Bhansali wrote specifically for her) and confirmed her involvement in the film in July 2003. She spoke positively of her rapport with Bachchan, and stated that she felt "humbled" with the actor, describing him as "a very modest person, very sweet, a father figure". Same as Bachchan, she accepted it to avoid the typecasting in romantic roles. Mukerji revealed that she was initially reluctant to play the part, when Bhansali read the story Black to her in June that year, because of the "challenging" subject and she had no reference to do it. She confessed, "I was scared when I heard the script. I wondered how I will play this character." In preparation, she also met children with physical disabilities, this time, at the Helen Keller Institute in Mumbai and practiced sign language there for six months. According to Mukerji, her interaction with them helped her to "gain sensitivity towards their reactions, aspirations and hopes". Moreover, she had to learn braille and found the experience was "like speaking with my hands and my fingers." In spite of that, she said that the film "has made me realize that those who are physically or mentally challenged are actually much stronger than normal, successful human beings."

The child artist Ayesha Kapur made her debut with Black, playing the version of Michelle. She learned sign language for prepared her brief role as well as Mukerji. Media reports stated that it was "the most difficult character ever written for a child", but Kapur refused that by saying, "I don't know how I played Michelle. I just did it. It wasn't that difficult, really." Shernaz Patel, who had only one film experience in Mahesh Bhatt's drama Janam (1985), portrayed Michelle's mother Catherine "Kathy"; she was cast by casting director Amita Sehgal on the basis of her work as a theatre actress. Nandana Sen played Michelle's younger sister Sarah, a role she described as "an emotional experience". She observed of her part, "...  she's a typical 16 year old ... You see her evolving in the film, from this oversensitive, moody teenager who is constantly hungry for more affection to a nurturing, loving, caregiver who deals with her sister's circumstances with a lot of love and understanding." She found Black to be "a pathbreaking film, both in terms of content and style", and called her role "a breakthrough" in her acting career. For it, she learned how to communicate with sign language, four months before the shooting.

Pre-production 

Bhansali—with his production company SLB Films—produced, financed, and distributed the film alongside Anshuman Swami of Applause Entertainment; another company, Yash Raj Films, also served as a distributor. Bhansali wrote the screenplay in three months, and the story with Bhavani Iyer and Kapadia; the latter two also wrote the dialogues in English and Hindi, respectively. When asked by Rediff.com's Subhash K. Jha, Bhansali found the English dialogues to be "too lucid to be left behind in translation". Omung Kumar was the art director for Black. In a party sequence featuring all of the lead cast from the film, he used 200 lamps on the ceiling. According to India Today, Bhansali was not sure about it, but he allowed Kumar to do that as an "experiment". He used black as the main color to be in tune with the film's themes.

Clothes for all actors from Black were done by the costume designer Sabyasachi Mukherjee for eight months. He spoke of excitement involved in the project: "Black was a brilliant experience, literally a once in a lifetime experience." He added that "the film is about you and me and, therefore, it called for serious clothes." In preparation, Mukherjee saw many black-and-white photographs. He used a lot of monochromatic colors—including beige, black, brown, gray, khaki, and indigo—for the film, as it is set between the 1950s and 1960s. For her role, Mukerji (who has green eyes) was required to use dark-tinted contact lenses. She did not use make-up, and she would only take fifteen minutes to prepared before filming. After the release of Black, Sabyasachi Mukherjee talked about his experiment with the film's two leads; he found working with Bachchan to be "amazing", as the latter "is so down-to-earth", and similarly to Mukerji, saying that she was the "girl-next-door" and "effortlessly brilliant".

Ranbir Kapoor and Sonam K Ahuja were chosen as assistant directors for Bhansali; the newcomers confessed that their motives were to get Bhansali to offer them acting jobs. They later made their debut as actors in Bhansali's next directorial venture, Saawariya (2007), an adaptation of Fyodor Dostoevsky's 1848 short story "White Nights", which was commercially and critically failed. Kapoor would go on to become one of the highest-paid actors in Bollywood while establishing himself as a leading actor of Indian cinema. Ahuja has a good career in Bollywood as well.

Filming 

Black was filmed in 100 days by Ravi K. Chandran. In an interview with Rediff.com, Chandran called it one of the most "important" films in his career and considered it as his favorite project; this also marked the first time he shot a film without songs. He revealed that he had previously rejected Bhansali's offers to shoots Devdas as he had busy schedules at that time. However, Chandran promised to collaborate with Bhansali in his next venture, which would be Black. When Bhansali narrated the film's story to him, Chandran decided to use the cinematography style same with that of Guru Dutt's 1959 drama Kaagaz Ke Phool. Sham Kaushal was the action director. Kapoor served as a body-double for Bachchan in several scenes.

In mid-January 2004, the entire cast and crew of Black went to Shimla to begin the first schedule. The first sequence filmed was the film's opening scene, featuring Mukerji stretching out her hand when snow begins to fall. Shimla was very cold at the time, but it did not show any signs that snow would fall. Therefore, the crew bought kilos of salt and snow-making machines from Mumbai's local markets. The media reported that the shooting would end at 04:00.

Filming moved to the film studio complex Film City the next month and India Today said that seventy percent of Black was shot there. The studio, which has a  area, was rented by Bhansali in January 2004 for 45 days, but on 18 February, a fire burned most of the set, resulting in a shooting delay. Bhansali recalled, "It was a torturous exercise and I couldn't sleep, but we needed continuity. I would not shoot if the cottage looked different." A month later, the art dealer Farida Hoosenwally also accused him for not return 390 artifacts she lent, and she sent a complaint letter to the Deputy Chief Minister of Maharashtra R. R. Patil. The schedule was continued on 28 February 2004. The filming was done two months later, and Bhansali's sister Bela Sehgal edited it. Canadian composer Mychael Danna completed its background score.

Soundtrack 

In October 2003, an article written by Savita Gautham of The Hindu reported that A. R. Rahman would work as the composer for Black. However, Monty Sharma (who previously collaborated with Bhansali in Devdas) replaced him for an unknown reason. Unlike Bhansali's previous ventures, it has only one lyrics-contained song, titled "Haan Maine Chukar Dekha Hai", written by Prasoon Joshi and performed by Gayatri Iyer. The entire soundtrack album, which has thirty-three songs, was released on iTunes on 10 February 2005 by Yash Raj Films' subsidiary YRF Music.

According to Sharma, he followed his grandfather Ram Prasad Sharma's teachings "to first recognise the known emotions within a situation and then try to see how those emotions can be taken into a different sphere through the music." For Mukerji's sequences, Monty Sharma used the low-octave sound from strings and pianos to create uplifting auras. While for Bachchan's, he used the Armenian instrument duduk. Iyer confessed that she loved every moment of recording the song, and added that: "It is not often that one gets to work in such a relaxed environment with so much focus on the artistic integrity of the piece. The focus was on feeling the emotional truth of the song."

The soundtrack album was positively reviewed by several critics. Joginder Tuteja of Bollywood Hungama, who gave a three-out-of-five-stars rating, was impressed by "Haan Maine Chukar Dekha Hai", writing, "The song is one of the best soft tracks in recent times and it's a pity that neither has it been publicized nor has been placed in the movie." Planet Bollywood's reviewer Shruti Bhasin also praised the song, and took note of the lyrics, saying that Joshi "works his magic" in it. Screen asserted, "In the film, the music merged so seamlessly with the narrative that it went unnoticed amidst the solid content. Luckily, we get to enjoy it unalloyed here." For his work, Monty Sharma won the Best Background Score trophy at the 51st Filmfare Awards. Additionally, he also won IIFA Award, Screen Award, and Zee Cine Award in the same category.

Release 
Black garnered attention before its release. In The Hindu Internet poll of "The Most Awaited Movie of 2005", the film peaked the first position with 66 percent. The trade analyst Amod Mehra felt that the film had good word-of-mouth publicity, though he believed that it would attract a restricted audience: "It might be difficult for such a subject to click in the B and C centres. One thing which could go against the film is that 60 percent of the film is in English." A similar sentiment was shared by the exhibitor Manoj Desai, saying that the film's subject was "very sensitive" and its first show would "decide the final outcome". The critic and journalist Taran Adarsh, however, stated: "It will be a great film. I am eagerly awaiting the premiere. Considering the technical brilliance of Bhansali, I pray that Black breaks the 2005 jinx. No film has succeeded this year so far."

On 24 January 2005, Bhansali organized a special screening of Black to Bachchan's and Mukerji's family, his mother and himself, and his close friends. Bachchan's wife Jaya was amazed with the film. She stated that it was "something we've never experience before. Black just ends all discussion", describing it as "the kind of movie experience that raises the scale of our cinema so high that you cannot classify its merits". The film's theatrical release was originally scheduled on 10 December 2004, but Bhansali decided to postpone it, as the date coincided with the new moon week, which he considered to be "inauspicious". It was opened in 170 different towns in India on 4 February 2005, the same day as the release of Leena Yadav's Shabd and Irfan Khan's Bullet: Ek Dhamaka. The film was released in South Korea on 28 August 2009 on 180 screens, a big number for a non-Korean film, with its distribution handled by Yash Raj Films. It clashed with two other Korean films, including Take Off and Tidal Wave.

Black has been screened at a number of events. On 21 January 2005, the film and a retrospective of Mukerji's films—Saathiya (2002), Chalte Chalte (2003), Hum Tum (2004) and Veer-Zaara (2004)—were screened with Arabic subtitles at the Casablanca Film Festival. It was showcased at the Indian Film Festival of Los Angeles on 20 April. The next month, the film was screened in the section of Marché du Film at the 2005 Cannes Film Festival. It was selected for the Indian Panorama section of the 36th International Film Festival of India in November. In 2012, the film was screened at the London Asian Film Festival. The latest was at the Seoul International Film Festival in 2017.

The world television premiere of the film took place on 25 September 2005 on Star Gold. Distributed by Dancing Dolphin, it was released on DVD on 20 November 2007 in all regions in a single-disc pack. A VCD version was released at the same time. The film was available for streaming on Amazon Prime Video in May 2017.

Critical reception 
Black received positive reviews, with most critics praising its story, Bhansali's direction, and the performances—mostly that from Bachchan and Mukerji. It received a rating of 87 percent on the review aggregator website Rotten Tomatoes based on six reviews, with an average rating of 8.5 out of 10.

The entertainment portal Bollywood Hungama gave the film two stars, finding it to be "relies heavily on performances". The critic observed of Mukerji, "With no dialogues in her lap, the actress conveys through expressions solely and what a terrific impact she makes! Here's a performance that should act as a reference guide for all aspiring actors. And yes, she's bound to walk away with all major awards next year as well!" Baradwaj Rangan of The New Sunday Express felt that the actress was "outstanding" in the part, which Rediff.com's Sita Menon described as "a pure, performance-driven role". Ziya Us Salam hailed her for "[pleasing] the [audience] eyes" despite her "minimal make-up". Khalid Mohammed of Mid-Day added, "Rani Mukherjee is a revelation, belting out a multi-nuanced performance which compels you to reach out for that hyperbolic adjective, awesome. Lock up all the awards already, they're hers." Devesh Sharma from Screen said that Bachchan and Mukerji have given "the performance of a lifetime", noting that with the film, "Bhansali has proved that we don't lack raw materials or the talent—all it takes is guts and a determined belief in oneself to make a world class film."

Jaspreet Pandohar of BBC opined that "Bhansali proves that neither he, nor the never better Bachchan, need a Hollywood film to produce an Oscar-worthy film [with Black]." She also took note of its production aspects; she lauded that the screenplay and cinematography were "carefully crafted" and "beautiful", respectively. In The Hindu, Gautaman Bhaskaran claimed that the film was the best among Bhansali's other directorial ventures. Namrata Joshi of Outlook wrote of how it "provides a redefining moment in commercial Hindi cinema, pushing its frontiers of narration and style". Sunny Dua of The Telegraph said, "Black is beautiful, for it is real. What is unreal is the way multicoloured, multilateral mainstream Hindi cinema has been suddenly rendered colourless. It will be hard to rate staple Bollywood fare from now, for the bar has been set way too bright by a stark, dark colour." Hindustan Times reviewer Vinayak Chakravorty rated Black three out of five stars, appreciating Kapur's portrayal of young Michelle and described her as "the anchor of the film's first half". Similar thoughts was given by Nikhat Kazmi, who felt that Kapur was "absolutely brilliant".

India Today called the film "a world-class Hindi film" and "a landmark", and found both Bachchan and Mukerji to be "brutally unattractive but always heart wrenching"; Shruti Gupta of NDTV added that they "score yet again with their performance". Writing for another Telegraph review, Anil Grover complimented the "fantastic" chemistry between the two actors. Shubhra Gupta of The Indian Express, also positively reviewed the chemistry, hailing it was "mesmeric". Gupta, however, believed that Mukerji "who really lights up" the film, concluding, "The tilt of the head, the face, alternating between animation and vacuousness, the slightly open mouth, the bewildered lost look, the jerky gait—any or all of it could have turned Michelle into a caricature. But Rani overcomes the handicap of being 'normal', and nails all of it down with an unsparing, unsentimental starkness." The Times of India critic Jhoomur Bose Malik praised Mukerji's costume, elaborating that "she did cut a diminutive yet striking picture with the cap, the structured black outfits and of course the no make-up look." Reviewing Bachchan's role, Subhash K. Jha saw that it resembled "Shakespearean tragic-hero" character.

Sushma Mohan of the Deccan Herald compared the film's story with Khamoshi: The Musical, and argued that it was "more complex and sensitive" but "better and finer" than the latter. The director and critic Raja Sen from Rediff.com also did a comparative review of Black with Paheli (2005), also starring Bachchan (in a guest appearance) and Mukerji (in a lead role opposite Shah Rukh Khan). He termed the former "a half-baked, often derivative and crucially flawed film", while called the latter "leads to a languorously unhurried fairytale, a unique love story told without fuss". In Black, Sen felt that its script "keeps [Mukerji's performance] from being an immortal [one]". Conversely, in Paheli, he believed that she had delivered "a powerful, sensuous, emotive performance". Derek Elley of Variety called Mukerji "seems to be hitting her stride as a serious actress". A reviewer of Empire said that Bhansali "expertly draws engaging, convincing [p]erformances" from the leads of Black despite his "unsentimental" direction. Pakistani magazine Newsline concluded, "[It] is an inspirational film and a must-see, even if only for its beautiful direction and acting."

Box office 
Black was successful at the box office in India and overseas, with trade analysts believed that it was influenced by its positive critical reviews. In India, the film had a theatrical run of nine weeks. It earned  on its opening day. The film earned  in India, making it the year's ninth highest-grossing film in the country. In North America, Black grossed $560,000 in four weeks. In the United Kingdom, it grossed $600,000 in four weeks. The film-trade website Box Office India estimated the Hindi language version's total collections to be , concluding its commercial performance to be "average".

In South Korea, the Korean language version was a major success upon release there in 2009. The newspaper Kyunghyang Shinmun reported that it sold 560,000 tickets and collected  within two weeks of its release.

Accolades 

Black was the fifth film to win all 4 major awards (Best Film, Best Director, Best Actor, and Best Actress) at the Filmfare Awards, after Guide (1965), Dilwale Dulhania Le Jayenge (1995), Kuch Kuch Hota Hai (1998) and Devdas. The film won a total of 11 awards at the ceremony, setting a record at the time for the most trophies for a single film. However, when the 65th Filmfare Awards was held in 2019, Gully Boy broke the record with 13 awards. Black won 3 awards at the 53rd National Film Awards, including those for Best Feature Film in Hindi and Best Actor (Bachchan). It also received 2 Anandalok Puraskar, 5 Bollywood Movie Awards, 9 International Indian Film Academy Awards, 11 Producers Guild Film Awards, 10 Screen Awards, 6 Stardust Awards, and 10 Zee Cine Awards.

Legacy 
Black has featured in several listings. In 2005, Richard Corliss of Time included it in "Best Movies of 2005", peaking at #5. He wrote, "In so many Indian films the deepest searches are for romantic ecstasy and for reconciliation with the father figure. By addressing both these needs, Black is more than a noble weepie; it is the ultimate Bollywood love story." The same year, it ranked #1 in Rachna Kanwar of The Times of India "25 Must See Bollywood Movies", stating that it was "made with astounding sensitivity and enthralling quest for perfection". In 2017, cultural professor Rachel Dwyer featured it in "70 Iconic Movies of Independent India", and in 2018, Lata Jha of Mint featured it in "10 Unusual Indian Film Takes on Disability".

Mukerji's performance has been noted as one of her notable works, and it was referenced in several films. In Golmaal: Fun Unlimited, a 2006 comedy by Rohit Shetty, actor Arshad Warsi dressed up as Mukerji's character. In 2010, Filmfare included her work in their listing of Indian cinema's "80 Iconic Performances", and wrote, "... Mukerji sure filled the silences with her stupendous presence and how. Mukerji has left an indelible mark with this role that usually comes once in a lifetime for most." In its March 2016 issue, New Woman magazine asserted: "It is hard to forget Mukerji ... essaying the role of a speech-impaired, deaf and blind girl with little or no make-up ... This was once when her action spoke louder than words."

Black was remade in Turkish as Benim Dünyam (2013), which generated controversies in the media. On 5 September, when TMC Films released its trailer, Bhansali sent some e-mails to the company as no remake rights had been purchased, but they did not make any replies. The remake was opened on 25 October 2013 to positive reviews from critics.

See also 

 List of films featuring the deaf and hard of hearing

Notes

References

External links 
 
 

2000s Hindi-language films
2005 films
Best Hindi Feature Film National Film Award winners
English-language Indian films
Films about blind people in India
Films about deaf people
Films directed by Sanjay Leela Bhansali
Films distributed by Yash Raj Films
Films featuring a Best Actor National Award-winning performance
Films shot in Himachal Pradesh
Films shot in Mumbai
Films that won the Best Costume Design National Film Award
Hindi films remade in other languages
Indian biographical drama films
Indian films about Alzheimer's disease
Indian Sign Language films
Films about disability